{{Infobox sports league
| title           = American Basketball Association (ABA)
| logo            = ABA2000Logo.PNG
| pixels          = 240px
| caption         = 
| sport           = Basketball
| founded         = 
| folded          = 
| fame            = 
| motto           = More than just a game
| teams           = 
| countries       = United StatesCanada
| continent       = North America
| champion        = Steel City Yellow Jackets (2022)
| most_champs     = 
| most successful club = Jacksonville Giants (7)
| website         = https://realabaleague.com/
}}

The American Basketball Association (ABA) is an American semi-professional men's basketball minor league that was founded in 1999.

The ABA has teams based in the United States and previously had international teams based in Canada and Mexico. In the past, there were traveling teams from countries such as Australia and Japan who played in the ABA. Additionally, there were players from other countries that were on a U.S. team to showcase other talented athletes in the country.

The current ABA bears no relation to the original American Basketball Association (1967–1976) that was considered a major league, and merged with the National Basketball Association (NBA) in 1976.

History
The current ABA was started by Joe Newman and Richard Tinkham. Tinkham was an executive with the Indiana Pacers when they were in the original ABA. They licensed the ABA name from the NBA.

2000–2003

The league started in 2000 with eight teams.  During its initial years of operation, the league focused mainly on teams in larger cities.  To attract fans, the ABA encouraged its members to fill rosters with former NBA players and past college basketball stars with local ties.

In 2002–03, the league suspended operations for reorganization. The league continued to play for the 2003–2004 season, but the focus had shifted from a few teams in large cities to numerous teams in both large and medium-sized cities. Franchise fees were lowered from $50,000 to $10,000 and the bond requirement was removed in order to attract new teams. The subsequent reduction in initial operating costs allowed the formation of several teams that might otherwise not be possible. However, it resulted in some under-financed ownership groups. Since 2004, several new teams have failed to complete their inaugural season due to financial insolvency.

Also, teams were organized into regional groups to facilitate interest and reduce travel costs starting with the 2003–2004 season.

2004–2006

The 2004–05 season was the first under this new format, with 37 teams playing that season. Among the league's coaches that season was the Nashville Rhythm's Ashley McElhiney, the first woman to be the head coach of a men's professional basketball team. Subsequent seasons brought drastic expansion. Some teams had proved to be successful in their early years, but others did not complete their initial seasons. At times, the ABA had 50+ teams playing each season. Some of the more successful expansion franchises during this era included the Arkansas RimRockers in 2004 and the Rochester RazorSharks in 2005. Both teams won the ABA title during their first seasons in the league.

2006–2007

The 2006–07 season saw the nominal cost for a new expansion franchise raised to $20,000, but many still sold for $10,000 – $5,000 or less. In some cases, teams were sold for as little as $1.  One notable 2006–07 expansion franchise was the Vermont Frost Heaves, owned by Sports Illustrated writer Alexander Wolff. Also in 2006–07, former NBA player John Salley was named league commissioner, and Maryland Nighthawks owner Tom Doyle was named chief operating officer.

Following the league's first public offering in 2006, it was reported that Joe Newman was voted out of his position as league CEO. The league's required Securities and Exchange Commission filings in February 2007 indicated that the ABA Board of Directors removed Newman as CEO on January 31, 2007. The filings further stated that Newman's actions as CEO would be reviewed to ensure that they were performed with the board's permission. The same filing also claimed that Newman and other shareholders plotted to remove Tom Doyle, John Salley, and David Howitt from the board and to elect Paul Riley as its director. Newman denied his removal ever occurred, and continued as acting CEO. The lawsuits were settled in March 2007 with Doyle's and Salley's resignations from the league's Board of Directors.

The 2006–07 season saw many franchises fail to travel to road games or to play a full schedule. When weather-related issues did not allow defending champion Rochester Razorsharks to travel for a playoff game against the Wilmington Sea Dawgs, the league attempted to force Rochester to forfeit rather than reschedule. Instead, Rochester chose to withdraw from the league. These several incidents caused some league owners to perceive instability within the league. These frustrated owners separated from the ABA to form the Premier Basketball League (PBL) in late 2007.

2007–2009

Nearly twenty teams folded within the first five weeks of the 2007–08 season, and several remaining teams left the ABA to join other existing leagues. According to Our Sports Central'', approximately 35% of the games scheduled for the season were played. The teams that played the highest percentage of games were Vermont, the Manchester (NH) Millrats, and the Quebec Kebs. At the conclusion of the season, all three of these teams left to join the PBL.

Another unique franchise for the 2008–09 season was the Beijing Aoshen Olympians, which had previously been kicked out of the Chinese Basketball League and played only home games in the ABA. All Olympians' games were played in Singapore. The Beijing franchise paid $3000 and all team flight accommodations to Singapore for each 2-game home-stand.

Following the 2007–2008 season, the league's most successful franchise by attendance, the Halifax Rainmen, left the ABA. Halifax ownership cited growing frustration with teams that did not show for scheduled games, as well as a biased ranking system. Sports media began to openly criticize the league and question its ability to be taken seriously.

The 2008–09 season saw the league conduct interleague play with the Continental Basketball Association.

2009–2010

The 2009–10 season was scheduled to have over 50 teams.  The season ended with several teams folding in early December, including the entire Northwest Division.  The league canceled several playoff games due to the inability of teams to afford travel.  The playoffs ended with Southeast Texas Mustangs defeating the Kentucky Bisons in a three-game series.

On April 25, 2010, as part of their ABA Global Initiative, the league hosted the 2010 ABA Friendship Games, in which the Philippine National Basketball Team competed against several ABA teams.

2010–2011

The 2010–11 season was expected to field over 60 teams, including a new Canadian Division.  In the summer of 2010, the league announced its first Haitian professional basketball team, the Haitian Relief. In total, the ABA planned to host over 800 games throughout the season.

However, the 2010–2011 campaign ended similar to previous seasons, with several teams folding either before or during the season. Instead of the promised 60 teams, the league fielded fewer than 50 full-time franchises that actually played games.

The 2011 ABA All-Star Game resulted in a 123–122 Eastern Conference win over the Western Conference in front of a crowd of 4,488 at the Jacksonville Veterans Memorial Arena in Jacksonville, Florida.  The playoffs started the following weekend, with the last four teams playing a double-elimination tournament at the home of the Southeast Texas Mavericks. The Mavericks won their second ABA title two games to none over the Gulf Coast Flash.

Despite continued instability, the league announced plans to form a new Women's American Basketball Association (WABA), unrelated to the original Women's American Basketball Association, which existed for one season in 2002. The new league's first squad was to be located in Greenville, North Carolina.

2012–2013

The league failed to launch the WABA in the 2011–12 season and announced new plans to launch for the 2012–2013 season. The second attempted launch was pushed back to the 2013–2014 season with nine initial teams set to play: the Philly Love, New Jersey Express, New England Stormers, Hampton Roads Lightning, Lake City Kingdom Riderettes, Fayetteville Lady Cadets, Columbus Lady Road Runners, McAllen Queens, and Chicago Lady Steam. As of February 2019, the WABA has yet to report any game results.

2013–2014

2015–2016

March 23, 2015 the ABA announced the launch of a new Media & Entertainment Division to be headed by hip hop mogul & ABA team owner Antjuan "Tjuan Benafactor" Washington.

On June 22, 2015, the ABA announced a multi-year partnership with Sports Radio America.  "The ABA on SRA Game of the Week" will showcase some of the best matchups in the ABA.

October 9, 2015, the ABA announced online live streaming partnerships with both LiveSportsCaster and WatchIDSN, two independent live sports streaming platforms based in Louisville, Kentucky, and Chicago, Illinois, respectively.

On April 9, 2016, the Jacksonville Giants won the ABA championship, their third, with a 93–90 win over the Windy City Groove. They had previously defeated the Groove 92–80 on April 8, 2016, to take the best-of-three series in straight games.

2016–2017

On February 10, 2017, the Hawaii Swish, owned by Geremy Robinson and a member of the Far West Division, debuted at Neal Blaisdell Arena with a game against the Yuba City Goldminers.

2018–2019

On April 13, 2019, the Jacksonville Giants captured their fourth straight and sixth overall ABA championship title with a 116–112 win over South Florida Gold.

League seasons

Defunct teams

The ABA policy of awarding a franchise to anyone who is willing to pay the ABA franchise fee, with no consideration given to whether the franchisee can afford to operate the team, resulted in over 200 folded franchises as of the beginning of the 2008 season. As of summer 2014, the number was over 350.

Champions

All-Star Game results

Awards

Player of the Year (MVP)
2001–02 – Pete Mickeal, Kansas City Knights
2003–04 – Joe Crispin, Kansas City Knights
2004–05 – Kareem Reid, Arkansas RimRockers
2005–06 – Chris Carrawell, Rochester Razorsharks
2006–07 – James Marrow
2007–08 – Anthony Anderson, Manchester Millrats
2008–09 – DeRon Rutledge, Southeast Texas Mavericks & Boris Siakam, Kentucky Bisons
2009–10 – Josh Pace, Southeast Texas Mavericks
2010–11 – Odell Bradley, Southeast Texas Mavericks
2017–18 – Maurice Mickens, Jacksonville Giants

MVP – Championship Game
2000–01 – Gee Gervin and Ndongo N'Diaye, Detroit Dogs
2001–02– Pete Mickeal, Kansas City Knights
2004–05 – Kareem Reid, Arkansas RimRockers
2005–06 – Chris Carrawell, Rochester Razorsharks
2008–09 – Michael James, Kentucky Bisons
2011–12 – Jermaine Bell, Jacksonville Giants
2015–16 – Maurice Mickens, Jacksonville Giants
2017–18 – Benard Nugent, Jacksonville Giants
2018–19 – Maurice Mickens, Jacksonville Giants
2021–22 – Steven Vorum, Steel City Yellow Jackets

Coach of the Year
2003–04 – Earl Cureton, Long Beach Jam
2004–05 – Rick Turner, Bellevue Blackhawks
2005–06 – Rod Baker, Rochester Razorsharks
2006–07 – Will Voigt, Vermont Frost Heaves
2007–08 – Will Voigt, Vermont Frost Heaves
2008–09 – Otis Key, Kentucky Bisons
2009–10 – Steve Tucker, Southeast Texas Mavericks
2010–11 – Steve Tucker, Southeast Texas Mavericks
2017–18 – Jerry Williams, Jacksonville Giants

Executive of the Year
2003–04 – Rafael Fitzmaurice, Juarez Gallos
2004–05 – Michael Tuckman, Bellevue Blackhawks
2005–06 – Orest Hrywnak, Rochester Razorsharks
2006–07 – Felix Krupczynski, Jacksonville JAM
2008–09 – Jay Sills, Kentucky Bisons
2017–18 – Abraham Muheize, San Diego Kings
2018-19 - Michael Steadman, San Francisco City Cats

MVP – All-Star Game
2001–02 – Maurice Carter, Kansas City Knights
2004–05 – Lou Kelly, West
2005–06 – Armen Gilliam, East
2006–07 – Billy Knight, West
2007–08 – Anthony Anderson, East
2008–09 – Keith Simpson, West 
2010–11 – Kayode Ayeni, East
2012–13 – Maurice Mickens, East
2015–16 – Terry Hosley, Team Dr. J
2016–17 – Christopher Cromartie, East
2017–18 – Ton Reddit – East

Community service
2006–07 – Modie Cox, Buffalo Silverbacks
2013–14 – Aurora Deiri, Texas Fuel

Best Offensive Player of the Year
2003–04 – Derrick Dial, Long Beach Jam

Best Defensive Player of the Year
2003–04 – Juaquin Hawkins, Long Beach Jam

Rookie Player of the Year
2004–05 – Daryl Dorsey, Las Vegas Rattlers

Statistical leaders

Scoring leaders

Rebounds leaders

Assists leaders

Anti-bully program
Former CEO Joe Newman started Bully-Free ABA! after his grandchildren became victims of bullying. The program features players visiting schools to share stories about their own experiences with bullying and how such issues can be solved.

Team coaches are involved as well, in 2012, Kitsap Admirals coach Chris Koebelin was an active leader in the program. Koebelin mentioned to the students during his visits that he was bullied as a child. Following the visits, time is usually allowed for the students to interact with the team on the court.

Notable past players

USA:
 Dennis Rodman
 Cedric Ceballos
 Dallas Comegys
 Armen Gilliam
 Antoine Carr
 Darryl Dawkins
 Sean Higgins
 Todd Day
 Anthony Miller
 Jason Sasser
 Pete Mickeal
 Chris Morris
 Byron Dinkins
 Benoit Benjamin
 Lawrence Roberts
 Anthony Goldwire
 David Vanterpool
 Anthony Anderson
 Toby Bailey
 Jamario Moon
 Chris Carrawell
 Brandon Williams
 Tony Farmer
 Gerald Paddio
 James Robinson
 Reggie Jordan
 Maurice Carter
 Dontae' Jones
 Chris Garner
 Lloyd Daniels
 Derrick Dial
 Oliver Miller
 Jannero Pargo
 Ramel Curry
 Eric Murdock
 Khalid Reeves
 Sam Mack
 Clay Tucker
 Eric Riley
 Anthony Pelle
 Jimmy King
 Charlie Bell
 Lawrence Moten
 Ryan Robertson
 Torraye Braggs
 Matt Walsh

Europe:
 Gheorghe Mureșan
  Jeff Nordgaard

Americas:
 Olden Polynice
 Horacio Llamas
 Reggie Freeman
 Felipe López

Africa:
 Ndongo N'Diaye
 Pape Sow
 Deng Gai

See also
 List of developmental and minor sports leagues

References

External links
 Official website of the American Basketball Association
 

 
1999 establishments in the United States
Basketball leagues in the United States
Companies traded over-the-counter in the United States
Publicly traded sports companies
Professional sports leagues in the United States
Sports leagues established in 1999